The list of ship decommissionings in 1976 includes a chronological list of all ships decommissioned in 1976.

See also

1976
 Ship decommissionings
Ship